Albert Septimus "Sep" Aspinall (7 December 1907 – ) was an English professional rugby league footballer who played in the 1920s and 1930s.

Background
Septimus Aspinall's birth was registered in York district, Yorkshire, he served in the Military Police during World War II, and his death was registered in York district, North Yorkshire, England.

Playing career

Challenge Cup Final appearances
Septimus Aspinall did not play (injury/suspension) in York's 8-22 defeat by Halifax in the 1930–31 Challenge Cup Final during the 1930–31 season at Wembley Stadium, London on Saturday 2 May 1931, in front of a crowd of 40,368.

County Cup Final appearances
Septimus Aspinall was suspended, and so he didn't play in Leeds' 5-5 draw with Wakefield Trinity in the 1934 Yorkshire County Cup Final during the 1934–35 season at Crown Flatt, Dewsbury on Saturday 27 October 1934, he returned from suspension (and Joe "Chimpy" Busch returned from injury) and played  in the 2-2 draw with Wakefield Trinity in the 1934 Yorkshire County Cup Final replay during the 1934–35 season at Fartown Ground, Huddersfield on Wednesday 31 October 1934, and he played left-, i.e. number 11, in the 13-0 victory over Wakefield Trinity in the 1934 Yorkshire County Cup Final second replay during the 1934–35 season at Parkside, Hunslet on Wednesday 7 November 1934.

Club career
Septimus Aspinall signed for York aged-19 on Thursday 24 November 1927, playing alongside Welsh ; Billy Thomas, he came to prominence at York, he was transferred from York to Leeds , he was transferred from Leeds "at a substantial fee" to Huddersfield on Monday 19 August 1935, he was transferred from Huddersfield to Featherstone Rovers on Friday 26 August 1938, he made his début for Featherstone Rovers against York on Saturday 27 August 1938, and he played his last match for Featherstone Rovers during the 1938–39 season.

Genealogical information
Septimus Aspinall's marriage to Annie (née Hunter) was registered during first ¼ 1928 in York district, Yorkshire. They had children; Kathleen D. Aspinall (birth registered fourth ¼ 1928 in York district, Yorkshire),  Josephine S. Aspinall (birth registered third ¼ 1931 in York district, Yorkshire), Albert Aspinall (birth registered fourth ¼ 1932 in York district, Yorkshire), Jacqualine A. Aspinall (birth registered second ¼ 1943 in York district, Yorkshire), and Patricia M. Aspinall (birth registered fourth ¼ 1944 in York district, Yorkshire).

References

External links
Search for "Aspinall" at rugbyleagueproject.org
On This Day - 31st October at therhinos.co.uk
Hall to aim for in club’s new bow to an eternal Fame
Apparent 'non' to York Wasps move
Back when never was no option
Search for "Sep Aspinall" at britishnewspaperarchive.co.uk

1907 births
1976 deaths
English rugby league players
Featherstone Rovers players
Huddersfield Giants players
Leeds Rhinos players
Rugby league centres
Rugby league locks
Rugby league second-rows
Rugby league players from York
York Wasps players